Ono is an unincorporated community located in the towns of Salem and Union, Pierce County, Wisconsin, United States. Ono is also commonly called Grange Hall because it was the location of the meeting hall for the local chapter of The National Grange of the Order of Patrons of Husbandry. The community's oldest existing structure is the Ono United Methodist Church which was built in 1862.

Frac Sand

Ono's largest employer is Muskie-Proppant which operates a large frac sand processing plant in the community.

References

Unincorporated communities in Pierce County, Wisconsin
Unincorporated communities in Wisconsin